As, AS, A. S., A/S or similar may refer to:

Art, entertainment, and media
 A. S. Byatt (born 1936), English critic, novelist, poet and short story writer
 "As" (song), by Stevie Wonder
 , a Spanish sports newspaper
 , an academic male voice choir of Helsinki, Finland
 Adult Swim, a programming block on Cartoon Network

Business legal structures 
 , a Czech form of joint-stock company
 , a Slovak form of joint-stock company
  or A/S, a type of Danish stock-based company
  or AS, a type of Norwegian stock-based company

Businesses and organizations 
 A.S. Roma, an Italian football club
 Alaska Airlines, IATA airline designator
  (Belgium), a World War II resistance organization
 Diario AS, a Spanish daily sports newspaper that concentrates particularly on football - branded as AS
 KK AS Basket, a Serbian basketball club
 , a French resistance organization
 Oakland Athletics, an American baseball team referred to as the A's
 Australian Standards, a standards organisation established in 1922
 Voiturettes Automobiles A.S., a French-based car manufacturer in 1920s
 AS Type A2, a sports car manufactured by Voiturettes Automobiles A.S.
 Towarzystwo Budowy Samochodów AS, a Poland-based car manufacturer in 1920s and 1930s
 AS (Polish car), a passenger car manufactured by Towarzystwo Budowy Samochodów AS

Education and research 
 Academia Sinica, the national academy of Taiwan
 AS-level (disambiguation), any of several uses in education
 Associate of Science, an American academic degree

Language 
 As language, a language of West Papua, Indonesia
 as, ISO 639-1 code for the Assamese language of India
 As (cuneiform), a written character
 Aš (cuneiform), a written character

Mathematics, science and technology

Computing 
 as (Unix), an assembler program
 .as, the Internet country code top-level domain for American Samoa
 ActionScript, for Flash and Flex applications
 Autonomous system (Internet), a collection of IP networks
 Application server, a computer running back-end applications

Health and medicine 
 Angelman syndrome, a neuro-genetic disorder
 Ankylosing spondylitis, a type of arthritis
 Aortic stenosis, a valvular heart disease
 Asparagine synthase (glutamine-hydrolysing), an enzyme
 Asperger syndrome, an autism spectrum disorder
 Auricular splint, a custom-made medical device used as part of ear surgery

Units of measurement
 Arcsecond,  arcminute, a unit of angular measurement
 Attosecond or as, 10−18 second, a subunit of time
 Attosiemens or aS, 10−18 siemens, a subunit of electric conductance

Other uses in mathematics and science 
 Abramowitz and Stegun, a mathematical reference work
 Aggregate supply, in economics, the total supply of goods
 Almost surely or a.s., in probability theory
 Arsenic, symbol As, a chemical element
 As (beetle), a genus in family Cerylonidae
 Tropical savanna climate, labelled As or Aw

Places

Europe 
 , a town in the Czech Republic
 , Norway
 As, Belgium, in Limburg
 , Norway
 , Swedish name for the  quarter in Helsinki, Finland

Other places
  ("New As"), a village in East Azerbaijan Province, Iran
  ("Old As"), a village in East Azerbaijan Province, Iran
 American Samoa (ISO 3166 code AS)
 .as, the Internet country code top-level domain for American Samoa
 Australia (NATO country code AS)

Religion 
  (singular: ,), one of the pantheon of Norse gods
 , Arabic for "Peace be upon him", post-nominal posthumous Islamic honorific

Other uses 
 As (Roman coin), a coin and unit of weight
 A.S., a calendrical system used in the Society for Creative Anachronism
 Anti-submarine warfare, A/S
 Old name for Ossetians, "As" or "Asi"
 Submarine tender, U.S. Navy hull classification symbol AS
 Altostratus, a cloud that is sometimes abbreviated as As.

See also 
 Aas (surname)